Jacqueline "Jacqui" Chan (born 1939) is a Chinese-Trinidadian dancer, actress and singer.

Early life
Chan was born in Port of Spain, Trinidad and Tobago to a Chinese mother and a Chinese-Russian father. Her parents had both migrated to British Guiana as indentured laborers to work on a sugar cane plantation after the abolition of slavery. She moved to London at age 16, and studied ballet at the Elmhurst Ballet School. She enrolled on a four-year teaching course at the Royal Academy of Dancing, but quit after a year and joined the cast of Teahouse of the August Moon.

Acting career
Chan became a principal dancer in the London  West End production of The King and I, and was soon placed in the London stage production of The World of Suzie Wong. In the immensely successful  film version of the play, she played, against type, the rather plain Gwennie earning appreciative notice. Subsequently she performed the leading role in the 1961 stage production in Australia.
Other acting roles included parts in Dixon of Dock Green, Armchair Theatre, Ghost Squad, The Saint, The Main Chance and Marco Polo. Chan also appeared in the movies Cleopatra and Krakatoa: East of Java.

Chan also performed a spoken interlude in Mandarin Chinese on the recording of the 1967 psychedelic song Kites by the British band Simon Dupree and the Big Sound, which reached number 9 on music charts in the United Kingdom in late 1967. According to the later testimony of the group's then-bassist, Peter O'Flaherty, he didn't know the meaning of the Chinese words that Chan was saying, and neither did she.

Popular culture
In the Netflix series The Crown, Chan is played by Chinese-born British actress Alice Hewkin. In the series, Chan is depicted having a brief sexual relationship with Antony Armstrong-Jones before his marriage to Princess Margaret. Her portrayal in the series has led to criticism, with some alleging her appearance played into orientalist stereotypes.

References

External links

 IMDB entry

Living people
1939 births
20th-century Trinidad and Tobago actresses
21st-century Trinidad and Tobago actresses
People educated at the Elmhurst School for Dance
People from Port of Spain
Trinidad and Tobago people of Russian descent
Trinidad and Tobago people of Chinese descent